Tafaoimalo Leilani Sina Naireen Tuala-Warren (born 28 November 1972) is a Samoan judge. She has been a Judge of the Supreme Court of Samoa since 29 April 2016. She is the second woman Supreme Court judge in Samoa.

Tuala-Warren was born in Apia to parents who were both lawyers, and was educated at Leifiifi College in Malifa and Tintern Grammar in Melbourne, Australia. She won an AUSAID scholarship to the University of Sydney, graduating with a Bachelor of Economics in 1993. She then won a NZODA Scholarship to Waikato University, where she graduated with a Bachelor and Master of Laws in 1997, before completing a pre-admission course at the university's Institute of Professional Legal Studies in 1998.

Tuala-Warren was a state solicitor in Samoa's Office of the Attorney-General from 1998 to 2002 before returning to Waikato University to teach from 2001 to 2005, variously as a tutor, teaching fellow and then law lecturer, teaching dispute resolution, corporate and commercial law and consumer protection.  She returned to Samoa in 2005 to work as a partner with her brother's firm, Tuala & Tuala Lawyers, in their litigation practice. Tuala-Warren became the Executive Director of the Samoa Law Reform Commission in 2009, and was appointed as a Samoa District Court judge in August 2013, holding both roles simultaneously. As District Court judge, she was the main judge for the Family Court and Family Violence Court.

She was appointed to the Supreme Court of Samoa in April 2016 after being recommended by the Court Commission, headed by the Chief Justice of Samoa. In January 2023 she announced she would be resigning from the court in March.

In August 2022 she was awarded a Distinguished Alumni Award by the University of Waikato. 

She is married to lawyer Aidan Warren.

References

Living people
1972 births
Samoan judges
Samoan women judges
Samoan lawyers
University of Waikato alumni
University of Sydney alumni
People from Apia